W. Wayne Townsend (May 1, 1926 – July 3, 2015) was an American politician from the U.S. state of Indiana. A Democrat, he was his party's gubernatorial nominee in 1984. Townsend was defeated by the incumbent Republican Governor Robert D. Orr.

References

1926 births
2015 deaths
American Quakers
Farmers from Indiana
Candidates in the 1984 United States elections
Democratic Party Indiana state senators
Democratic Party members of the Indiana House of Representatives
Purdue University College of Agriculture alumni
People from Hartford City, Indiana
People from Grant County, Indiana